European route E 951 is a European B class road in Greece, connecting the cities of Ioánnina and Mesolóngi.

Route 
 
 E90 Ioánnina
 Árta
 Agrínio
 E45 Mesolóngi

External links 
 UN Economic Commission for Europe: Overall Map of E-road Network (2007)
 International E-road network

International E-road network
Roads in Greece